Giraavaru Island may refer to:
 Giraavaru (Kaafu Atoll) (Maldives)
 Giraavaru (Raa Atoll) (Maldives) on List of islands of the Maldives